Crambus kumatakellus is a moth in the family Crambidae. It was described by Shibuya in 1928. It is found in Taiwan.

References

Crambini
Moths described in 1928
Moths of Asia